The Substitute Stenographer, from Edison Studios, was a 1913 American silent film (short) directed by Walter Edwin The film was the third of three "Kate Kirby's Cases"  detective tales produced with Edison in 1913 before actress Laura Sawyer left Edison to continue the series later that year with the Famous Players Film Company and the director of the other five films, J. Searle Dawley. It was released in the United States on 4 August 1913.

Plot
Described simply as "A Detective Story", the plot summary in The Edison Kinetogram was:

Cast
 Herbert Prior as Andrew Clark
 Bessie Learn as the Stenographer
 Richard Neill as the Head Clerk
 Robert Brower as the Police Inspector
 Laura Sawyer as Kate Kirby, the detective
 Harry Beaumont as James Clark, Andrew's brother
 Arthur Housman as the Second Clerk

Kate Kirby's cases
 The Diamond Crown. (Edison – 1913) 
 On the Broad Stairway. (Edison – 1913) 
 The Substitute Stenographer. (Edison – 1913) 
 Chelsea 7750. (Famous Players  – 1913)
 An Hour Before Dawn. (Famous Players  – 1913)
 The Port of Doom. (Famous Players  – 1913)

Sources

External links
 
 

American silent short films
American black-and-white films
1913 films
1910s English-language films
1910s American films